Meredith Braun (born 1973) began her career as a child actor in her native New Zealand before relocating to the UK and starring in a number of West End musicals and touring productions.

Early life 
As a child in Remuera, Auckland, Braun appeared in numerous stage productions plus occasional television shows (The Haunting of Barney Palmer) and advertisements.

Her mother studied at the Royal College of Music in the 1950s and at the age of 16 Braun moved from New Zealand to London. In 1989, Braun earned a place at London's prestigious Italia Conti Academy of Theatre Arts.

Career 
She began her West End career six months later with a lead role in short-lived musical Bernadette at the Dominion Theatre. Cameron Mackintosh then cast Meredith as Eponine in Les Miserables, a role she played in both London and Manchester. In 1993, she was cast as Betty Schaeffer in Andrew Lloyd Webber's musical version of Sunset Boulevard. Having been part of an audition process that involved 300 other potential actresses, Lloyd Webber said of Meredith "When I saw Meredith and heard her I knew she was going to be a star".

Further shows in the West End included starring as Christine in The Phantom of the Opera plus Out of the Blue with Michael McCarthy and Killing Rasputin.  Between 2000-2001 Meredith starred as Lily in the RSC's production of The Secret Garden at both the Theatre Royal Stratford and the Aldwych Theatre, London.

Between 1995 and 1997, Braun returned home to her native Auckland, landing numerous roles in one of New Zealand's leading professional theatre companies, the Auckland Theatre Company. She came with the prestige as one of the starring names within New Zealand's theatre industry at the time.

Braun also acted as Belle in Disney's 1992 holiday film The Muppet Christmas Carol opposite Michael Caine and the cast of The Muppets, and has done a number of television roles in the United Kingdom.

After a ten-year absence from performing, Braun released her debut solo album Someone Else's Story in 2012 - a mix of contemporary show songs and classical crossover material. The album features musical direction and arrangements by Paul Bateman (musical director for Sarah Brightman and Lesley Garrett), and was released on Stage Door Records on March 26, 2012.

In 2017, Braun released her second solo album When Love Is Gone featuring a new recording of the song of the same name she performed in The Muppet Christmas Carol marking the film's 25th anniversary. The album was released by Stage Door Records in November 2017.

Meredith now works as a lecturer for The University of Chichester Conservatoire's BA (hons) Musical Theatre (Music) Course, having previously been a lecturer for Musical Theatre Triple Threat.

Filmography

Film and television

UK theatre credits

New Zealand theatre credits

Workshops

Personal life 
Braun has three children by her first husband, musical director David White, (twins born 1997-1998) and a son, Tiger Braun-White, a cellist, (born 2003-2004). Her second husband, Bill Rea, is a marine architect.

References

External links
 
 
 London Musicals Online

1973 births
Living people
21st-century New Zealand women singers
New Zealand film actresses
New Zealand musical theatre actresses
New Zealand television actresses
People from Auckland
20th-century New Zealand women singers
New Zealand emigrants to the United Kingdom